Tamil Nadu Thowheed Jamath (TNTJ) is an Islamic organization based in Tamil Nadu, India. It was founded in 2004. TNTJ claims to preach true Islam to Muslims and non-Muslims as per Quran and Prophetic ways. It claims to be a non-political organization. Ideologically due to its theological stand, it considers only a sovereign state can take up weapons and any thing contrary is against the fundamentals of Islam. TNTJ is also involved in social activities and awareness of condemning extremism through rallies and propaganda. TNTJ's ideology is influenced by Wahabism.

Social activities

Community work 
Donation of blood is highly encouraged among TNTJ followers. It has won government awards for making the highest amount of blood donations in Tamil Nadu in about 10 successive years. It has offered help and support during tsunami relief in several affected areas. Its relief program during Chennai flood of 2015, whose estimated cost was twenty five crore, was a noticeable one. TNTJ has also created awareness among masses about dengue fever.

Magazines

Structure 

 All India Thowheed Jamath (AITJ)
 Sri Lanka Thowheed Jamath (SLTJ)
 Qatar India Thowheed Centre (QITC)
 UAE Thowheed Jamath (Dubai TNTJ)
 United States Thowheed Jamath (USTJ)
 United Kingdom Thowheed Jamath (UKTJ)
 France Thowheed Jamath (FRTJ)
 Australia Thowheed Jamath (ATJ)

About

Protests 
TNTJ has held demonstrations and protests across Tamil Nadu several times on various issues including reconstruction of Babri Masjid, removal of liquor shops and load shedding. Its leaders encourages followers to observe peaceful protests and to avoid any inconvenience to traffic. In September 2012, the U.S. Consulate encouraged U.S. citizens traveling in and around Chennai to exercise caution and monitor local media for security updates, owing to a protest by TNTJ following an anti-Islamic movie. On 28 January 2014, TNTJ organized a protest to demand increase in reservation for Muslims in Tamil Nadu.

TNTJ expels founder for sexually inappropriate behaviour 

In May 2018, P Jainulabideen, the founder of TNTJ, was expelled from the organisation after several audios were released that appeared to show PJ behaving sexually inappropriately with women.

Controveries 
 
As reported by three references provided, on March 19, 2022, Tamil Nadu police arrested a leader of the Tamil Nadu Thowheed Jamath over allegations of issuing death threat to the judges of the Karnataka High Court concerning the court's verdict on a case related to wearing hijab in schools and colleges where the school or college uniform is mandated.

References

External links 
Official Website of TNTJ

Islamic organisations based in India
Islamic organizations established in 2004
2004 establishments in Tamil Nadu